Wang Zhongcai (born November 1963) is a vice admiral in the People's Liberation Army of China who is the current deputy commander of the Eastern Theater Command and commander of the Eastern Theater Command Navy.

Biography

After university, he was assigned to the North Sea Fleet, where he successively served as trainee deputy captain of Siping missile frigate, deputy captain of Harbin missile destroyer and deputy captain of Qingdao missile destroyer, and vice captain and captain of Hangzhou missile destroyer.

In 2018, he was appointed commander of the newly founded China Coast Guard.

In June 2022, he was recalled to the original Eastern Theater Command and commissioned as deputy commander and commander of its Navy.

He attained the rank of rear admiral (shaojiang) in July 2017 and vice admiral  (zhongjiang) in June 2022.

References

1963 births
Living people
People from Li County, Hebei
People's Liberation Army generals from Hebei
People's Republic of China politicians from Hebei
Chinese Communist Party politicians from Hebei